The Second Wisconsin Legislature convened from January 10, 1849, to April 2, 1849, in regular session. Senators representing odd numbered districts were newly elected for this session and were serving the first year of a two-year term.  Senators representing even numbered districts were serving the second year of their two-year term.

Major events

 March 4, 1849: Inauguration of Zachary Taylor as the 12th President of the United States.
 November 6, 1849: Nelson Dewey re-elected Governor of Wisconsin.

Major legislation

 February 8, 1849: Joint resolution related to Slavery and the Slave trade, 1849 Joint Resolution 2
 March 6, 1849: Act to extend the boundaries of the county of Marquette, 1849 Act 73
 March 8, 1849: Act in relation to the boundaries of the counties of Columbia, Adams, Sauk, Chippewa, La Pointe, and St. Croix, 1849 Act 77
 March 8, 1849: Act to extend the boundaries of Winnebago county, 1849 Act 79
 March 10, 1849: Joint resolution relative to a proposed amendment to the constitution of the United States, concerning the election of Senators in congress, 1849 Joint Resolution 5
 March 22, 1849: Act submitting the question of the extension of the right of suffrage to a vote of the People, 1849 Act 137. Setting a referendum for the 1849 general election which would grant voting rights to African Americans living in Wisconsin.  The referendum passed, but the legality was challenged.  The Wisconsin Supreme Court finally upheld the result of the 1849 referendum in the 1866 case of Gillespie v Palmer and others.
 March 31, 1849: Joint resolution instructing the Hon. Isaac P. Walker to resign his seat as United States Senator, 1849 Joint Resolution 9.
 March 31, 1849: An Act in relation to homicide.  Created Wisconsin's first law criminalizing abortion.

Party summary

Senate summary

Assembly summary

Sessions
 1st Regular session: January 10, 1849April 2, 1849

Leaders

Senate leadership
 President of the Senate: John E. Holmes, Lieutenant Governor

Assembly leadership
 Speaker of the Assembly: Harrison Carroll Hobart

Members

Members of the Senate
Members of the Wisconsin Senate for the Second Wisconsin Legislature (19):

Members of the Assembly
Members of the Assembly for the Second Wisconsin Legislature (66):

Employees

Senate employees

 Chief Clerk: William Rudolph Smith
 Assistant Clerk: P. N. Bovee
 Enrolling Clerk: G. W. Boardman
 Engrossing Clerk: Henry B. Welsh
 Transcribing Clerk: William Dutcher
 Messenger: Moritz Morgenstine
 Doorkeeper: J. S. Delno
 Fireman: S. B. Sibley
 Sergeant-at-Arms: W. Shellmer

Assembly employees

 Chief Clerk: Robert L. Ream
 Chief Clerk pro tem: Daniel Noble Johnson
 Assistant Clerk: William Hull
 Assistant Clerk pro tem: Alexander T. Gray
 Enrolling Clerk: Aaron V. Fryer
 Engrossing Clerk: J. J. Driggs
 Transcribing Clerk: Lyman Cowderey
 Messenger: Marshall Ten Eyk
 Doorkeeper: C. W. White
 Fireman: Samuel Noyes
 Sergeant-at-Arms: Felix McLinden

References

External links

1849 in Wisconsin
Wisconsin
Wisconsin legislative sessions